Under United States patent law, a provisional application is a legal document filed in the United States Patent and Trademark Office (USPTO), that establishes an early filing date, but does not mature into an issued patent unless the applicant files a regular non-provisional patent application within one year.  There is no such thing as a "provisional patent".  

A provisional application includes a specification, i.e. a description, and drawing(s) of an invention (drawings are required where necessary for the understanding of the subject matter sought to be patented), but does not require formal patent claims, inventors' oaths or declarations, or any information disclosure statement (IDS). Furthermore, because no examination of the patentability of the application in view of the prior art is performed, the USPTO fee for filing a provisional patent application is significantly lower ($75 - $300 as of May 5, 2021) than the fee required to file a standard non-provisional patent application. A provisional application can establish an early effective filing date in one or more continuing patent applications later claiming the priority date of an invention disclosed in the provisional application by one or more of the same inventors. 

The same term is used in past and current patent laws of other countries with different meanings.

History 
The provisional application was introduced to U.S. patent law with a 1994 amendment of the Patent Act of 1952.  A 12-month benefit of priority to foreign-filed applications had been a part of U.S. patent law since the 1901 U.S. ratification of the Brussels revision of the Paris Convention for the Protection of Industrial Property.  The 1994 introduction of the provisional application thus provided a domestic filing equivalent matching the 12-month priority benefit that had been afforded to foreign applications for the better part of the 20th century.

Characteristics 
The earliest filing date of a "provisional" (application) may be very important where, for example, a statutory condition of patentability is about to expire and there is insufficient time to generate a complete non-provisional application. In many cases, a provisional is filed the same day as a public disclosure of the invention, which disclosure could otherwise permanently jeopardize the patentability in non-U.S. countries having strict requirements on "complete or absolute novelty". In other cases the provisional application is filed within a grace-period year after such a disclosure in order to preserve only the inventor's U.S. patent rights.

The date of filing of the provisional patent application can also be used as the foreign priority date for applications filed in countries other than the United States and for an international application, but not for a design patent. The filing of a provisional application triggers a review period for the U.S. license necessary for the subsequent foreign or international filings. Though the "provisional" need not be submitted in English, a translation will be required when (and if) a non-provisional application claims the benefit of the provisional.

A provisional application, as such, is never examined by the USPTO, and therefore will never become a patent on its own (unless the provisional patent application is later converted into a non-provisional patent application by the applicant, and then the application is examined as a non-provisional application).  The provisional application is also not "published", but becomes a part of any later non-provisional application file that references it, and thus becomes "public" upon issuance of a patent claiming its priority benefit.

A "provisional" is automatically abandoned (expires) one year after it is filed.  The provisional filing date is not counted as part of the 20-year life of any patent that may issue with a claim to the provisional filing date.

The United States Patent and Trademark Office (USPTO) announced on December 8, 2010, that it was implementing a Missing Parts Pilot Program. This pilot program would provide applicants with a 12-month extension to the existing 12-month provisional application period.  This pilot program would not change the requirement for an applicant to file a non-provisional application within 12 months; though it would allow additional time to reply to a missing parts notice.

Procedure and benefits 

To obtain the benefit of the "provisional" filing date, a non-provisional patent application must be filed, claiming benefit of the filing date of one or more specific provisional patent applications, prior to their expiration.  

The provisional patent application is only pending for 12 months prior to becoming abandoned. Thus, filing a non-provisional patent application claiming the benefit of the provisional application must be done within 12 months. Otherwise, the rights to claim the benefit of provisional application are lost.

If a non-provisional application is not expected to be filed within one year, and the patent is not otherwise barred by law, another provisional application may also be filed at any time and start another one-year period (but this does not work in all cases).  However, the original priority date of any expired provisional applications will be forfeited.  

The provisional priority date is of little consequence for any claims in the issued patent that are not supported by the disclosure in the priority document. This makes it very important that provisional applications be sufficiently detailed. Otherwise, the validity of an issued patent may be challenged as to the priority date of its claims that purport to relate back to an insufficient "provisional".  Furthermore, during the year after filing the first provisional (and prior to filing a non-provisional application), it may be useful to file additional provisional applications as improvements are made, and then claim priority of those found useful in drafting the non-provisional application(s).

One popular use of a provisional application is to document and "lock in" potential patent rights while attempting to obtain sponsors for further development (and for more expensive patent applications).  This tactic may permit an inventor to defer major patent application costs until the commercial viability (or futility) of the invention becomes apparent.  However, wise investors consider provisional applications in view of the long road to potential patentability, not to mention the limitations that may be defined by the prior art.

If a prior-art search during the one-year period reveals that what the inventor thought was the invention is found to be an obvious aggregation of prior-art elements or steps, the invention may still be patentable if the provisional application describes a non-obvious novel structure, element, or step.  This novel structure can be claimed in the non-provisional patent application, instead of claiming the invalid aggregation. 

Information Disclosure Statements (IDSs) are not permitted in provisional applications. Since no substantive examination is given in provisional applications, a disclosure of information is unnecessary. Any such statement filed in a provisional application will be returned or destroyed at the option of the Office.

The advantages of a provisional patent application are:
 ease of preparation,
 lower cost, and
 the ability to use the term "patent pending", which can only be legally used when a patent application has been filed, and which may have significant marketing advantages. 

As of May 6, 2021, the USPTO small-entity filing fee is $150 for provisional patent applications having 100 or fewer pages of specification and drawings. Complexity involved for a provisional application on the part of both the applicant and the USPTO is generally much less than that of a non-provisional patent application.  Thus, it is possible to file a provisional patent application more quickly and cheaply than a non-provisional patent application. 

It is also possible to convert a non-provisional application into a provisional, under limited circumstances (e.g., within a year of filing, when the applicant discovers a reason not to pursue the present non-provisional application).

Free and pro bono assistance 
A number of free or almost-free resources exist to help inventors prepare and/or file their provisional applications. The USPTO provides information related to its patent pro bono program, which aims at assisting "inventors and small businesses that meet certain financial thresholds and other criteria ... for free legal assistance in preparing and filing a patent application." The website provides links to USPTO endorsed websites that provide free pro bono services to inventors. Further, the USPTO also permits law school students to practice IP law under the guidance of law school faculty supervisor and provides a list of participating law schools on its website.

See also 
 Patent caveat
 Provisional rights

References

External links 
 Provisional Application for Patent at the USPTO.

United States patent law